William Clark Green (born May 19, 1986) is an American country music singer from Flint, Texas.  He has released six studio albums and two live albums, the most successful of which is Ringling Road from 2015.

Origin
Green is from Flint, Texas. He attended A&M Consolidated High School in College Station, Texas, graduating in 2004 before he went to Texas Tech University in Lubbock, Texas. It took six years for him to graduate as he concentrated on his music career.  He currently lives in Eastland, Texas.

Music career
Green recorded his debut album in 2008 while attending Texas Tech in Lubbock. On September 24, 2008, the album Dangerous Man was released. In 2010, he released Misunderstood, his second album, as a follow-up.

2012: Rose Queen
In 2012, Green recorded his third album, Rose Queen, at Sixteen Ton Studio in Nashville, Tennessee. The album was released on April 30, 2013. This became his breakthrough album. The first single from the album was "It’s About Time," which became his first Top Ten song on Texas Radio. He had a No. 1 regional hit with the song "She Likes the Beatles," and the album yielded three top ten singles on the Texas country charts.  According to Green, the album was inspired by the town of Tyler, Texas which has a local tradition called the Texas Rose Festival.

2015: Ringling Road
On April 21, 2015, Green released his fourth album, Ringling Road.  The album debuted on Billboard 200 at No. 133 and the Top Country Albums chart at No. 18, with 4,600 copies sold in the US.  The first single from the album was "Sympathy" which topped the Texas Music Chart.  The second single was "Sticks and Stones".  According to Green, the album was inspired by the town of Eastland, Texas.

Green contributed a song to Dreamer: A Tribute to Kent Finlay, an album released in early 2016 on Austin-based Eight 30 Records, titled "Still Think About You." This work is a co-write with Finlay.

A live album, Live At Gruene Hall, was released on September 23, 2016. It sold 1,100 copies in its debut week.

2018–present: Hebert Island and Baker Hotel
A fifth album, Hebert Island, was released on August 10, 2018.

In November 2019, he released his second live album, Live At Cheatham Street Warehouse, recorded at the Cheatham Street venue in San Marcos, Texas.

In 2022, Green released his sixth studio album, Baker Hotel.

Discography

Studio albums

Live albums

References

American country singer-songwriters
American male singer-songwriters
Living people
Country musicians from Texas
1986 births
People from Smith County, Texas
Singer-songwriters from Texas
People from Eastland, Texas
21st-century American singers
21st-century American male singers
Thirty Tigers artists